Richard Higbie (July 11, 1857 in West Islip, Suffolk County, New York – April 10, 1900 in Babylon, Suffolk Co., NY) was an American politician from New York.

Life
He attended the public schools, and then became a merchant.

He was Supervisor of the Town of Babylon for four years.

Higbie was a member of the New York State Assembly (Suffolk Co.) in 1893, 1894 and 1895.

He was a member of the New York State Senate (1st D.) from 1896 to 1898, sitting in the 119th, 120th and 121st New York State Legislatures. He was also a member of the New York State Republican Committee.

He died on April 10, 1900, at his home in Babylon, New York, of "heart disease". He died soon after returning from a local political convention held at Amityville at which he had been elected a delegate to the Republican state convention

Sources
 The New York Red Book compiled by Edgar L. Murlin (published by James B. Lyon, Albany NY, 1897; pg. 150f, 404 and 510ff)
 Sketches of the members of the Legislature in The Evening Journal Almanac (1895; pg. 63)
 DEATH OF RICHARD HIGBIE in NYT on April 11, 1900

1857 births
1900 deaths
Republican Party New York (state) state senators
People from Babylon, New York
Republican Party members of the New York State Assembly
Town supervisors in New York (state)
People from West Islip, New York
19th-century American politicians